Trondhjems nationale Scene was a theatre that opened in Trondheim in 1911, and closed in 1927. The theatre's first artistical director was Thora Hansson, from 1911 to 1913. The opening performance was held on 15 September 1911, with Bjørnstjerne Bjørnson's play Sigurd Jorsalfar with Grieg's music, and Ibsen's play Fruen fra Havet was performed the next day. The theatre performed eighteen different plays the first season.

After the theatre closed in 1927, it would take ten years until Trondheim again had a permanent theatre, when Trøndelag Teater opened in 1937.

Theatre directors 
Thora Hansson 1911–1913
Ludvig Müller 1913–1916
Rasmus Rasmussen 1916–1923
Hans Bille 1923–1924
Johan Hauge 1924–1925
Victor Ivarson 1926–1927

References

Former theatres in Norway
Theatres completed in 1911
1911 establishments in Norway
1927 disestablishments in Norway
Buildings and structures in Trondheim